Kaleidoscope (The Classic Television Organisation), is a nonprofit organisation that recovers and stores classic television programmes in their archive. In the past the organisation has staged television festivals in the West Midlands area, having release numerous television research guides. Proceeds from such events are donated to the Royal National Lifeboat Institution.

History 
Kaleidoscope was formed in 1988 by television enthusiasts to show appreciation and to research vintage television shows. In late 2013, ten years after Bob Monkhouse died, a large number of television and radio programmes were donated to Kaleidoscope from Monkhouse's archive.

From 1993, along with the British Film Institute Kaleidoscope have been running a campaign called Missing, Believed Wiped (sometimes called: Raiders of the Lost Archive). The campaign has led to numerous episodes being recovered from Steptoe and Son, Dad's Army, a Dennis Potter play and more than sixty classic BBC or ITV programmes from 1957 to 1969 in the Library of Congress

The organisation was also featured in a 2015 edition of BBC television programme Inside Out which discussed the subject of missing television.

Notable recoveries
 The Avengers – one episode.
 Celebrity Squares – twenty five episodes
 The Golden Shot – fourteen episodes
 Ivor the Engine – two seasons of early editions
 Late Night Horror – one episode
 The Likely Lads – two episodes
 Out of the Unknown – one episode
 Play School – two editions
 Sale of the Century – two episodes
 Till Death Us Do Part – two episodes
 Top of the Pops – five episodes
 Z Cars – four episodes

See also
 Wiping
 Missing Believed Wiped
 BBC Archive Treasure Hunt
 Doctor Who missing episodes
 Dad's Army missing episodes

References

External links
 Official Kaleidoscope Site

Non-profit organisations based in the United Kingdom
Companies based in Birmingham, West Midlands
British companies established in 1988